Hallelujah, I'm a Bum is a 1933 American pre-Code musical comedy film directed by Lewis Milestone and set in the Great Depression.

The film stars Al Jolson as Bumper, a popular New York tramp, and both romanticizes and satirizes the hobo lifestyle into which many people were forced by the economic conditions of the time. It is noted for its heavy leftist overtones and freewheeling style. Among the production's supporting cast are Frank Morgan, silent comedian Harry Langdon, Chester Conklin of the Keystone Kops, and vaudevillian Edgar Connor. Morgan, who portrays the Wizard in the 1939 version of The Wizard of Oz, foreshadows a line in the later film when he says to Al Jolson, "There's no place like home, there's no place like home".

Cast
 Al Jolson as Bumper
 Madge Evans as June Marcher
 Frank Morgan as Mayor John Hastings
 Harry Langdon as Egghead
 Chester Conklin as Sunday
 Tyler Brooke as Mayor's Secretary
 Tammany Young as Orlando
 Bert Roach as John
 Edgar Connor as Acorn
 Dorothea Wolbert as Apple Mary
 Louise Carver as Ma Sunday

Music
The music was composed by Richard Rodgers and the lyrics by Lorenz Hart. The score includes the jazz standard "You Are Too Beautiful", which is played several times throughout the movie.

The complete list of musical numbers in the film is:
 "I Gotta Get Back to New York"
 "My Pal Bumper"
 "Hallelujah, I'm a Bum"
 "Laying the Cornerstone"
 "Sleeping Beauty" (dropped before the film was released)
 "Dear June"
 "Bumper Found a Grand"
 "What Do You Want With Money?"
 "Kangaroo Court"
 "I'd Do It Again"
 "You Are Too Beautiful"

Reception
In 1998, Jonathan Rosenbaum of the Chicago Reader included the film in his unranked list of the best American films not included on the AFI Top 100.

See also
 List of United Artists films

References

External links

 
 
 

1933 films
1933 musical comedy films
1933 romantic comedy films
American musical comedy films
American romantic comedy films
American romantic musical films
American black-and-white films
Films directed by Lewis Milestone
Great Depression films
United Artists films
1930s romantic musical films
1930s English-language films
1930s American films